1942: Joint Strike is a video game developed by Backbone Entertainment for Xbox 360 through Xbox Live Arcade and PlayStation 3 through PlayStation Network. It was released in 2008. It is the remake of the original 1984 video game 1942.

Gameplay

The game is an amalgamation of various elements of the 19XX series. It includes health meter and bomb system from 1943: The Battle of Midway; charge-fire, land-based battle sections and rank increases from 1941: Counter Attack; and fighter lineup, bomb-based end-level bonus and level rank system from 19XX: The War Against Destiny.

Reception

The game received "average" reviews on both platforms according to the review aggregation website Metacritic. IGN commented on the short length of the game, "spotty" online play and poor value for money, but praised the graphical overhaul. Anthony Gallegos of 1UP.com stated that while the game was short, this added to its 'arcade' appeal. As of year-end 2010, the game has sold over 111,000 units. Sales at year-end 2011 were over 119,000 units.

References

External links
Developer Backbone page

2008 video games
Capcom games
Anti-war video games
Vertically scrolling shooters
World War II video games
Cooperative video games
Video games developed in Canada
Video game remakes
Xbox 360 Live Arcade games
Xbox 360 games
PlayStation 3 games
PlayStation Network games
Video games set in 1942